Fenu Paree is a 2007 Maldivian teen fantasy romantic comedy short-film, written, produced and directed by Ali Seezan. The film stars Lufshan Shakeeb, Mariyam Siyadha, Mariyam Afeefa and Muslima Abdulla in pivotal roles. The film was an unofficial remake of American teen fantasy film Aquamarine (2006) directed by Elizabeth Allen, loosely based on the 2001 young adult novel of the same name by Alice Hoffman.

Premise
Suzanna (Mariyam Afeefa) spends her last few days in her home island with her best friend, Shau (Aishath Muslima) before Suzanna relocates to Male'. One day, when Suzanna was enjoying sometime at the beach, she sees something strange with a tail in the sea. The girls go back and explore the following day, and find a mermaid named Fenu Paree (Aishath Siyadha) who becomes friend with the girls instantly.

Fenu Paree reveals her mission to find true love in order to get away from an arranged marriage and requests the girl to help her accomplish it, in return she will grant a wish from the girls. Since Suzanna was not aware of how love works in the human world, she is immediately rejected by Huzam (Lufshan Shakeeb) whom everyone including the girls have a crush on. The friends work on several strategies to win Huzam's love for Fenu Paree.

Cast 
 Lufshan Shakeeb as Huzam
 Mariyam Siyadha as Fenu Paree
 Mariyam Afeefa as Suzanna
 Muslima Abdulla as Shau
 Nashidha Mohamed as Neelam
 Ali Seezan as Fenu Paree's father (Special appearance)
 Hishama as Suzanna's mother

Soundtrack

Accolades

References

Maldivian short films
2007 short films
2007 films
Remakes of Maldivian films
Films directed by Ali Seezan